Dave Haynie is an American electrical engineer and was chief engineer at Commodore International. He is vocal in the Amiga community.

See also
 Metabox (on German Wikipedia)
 PIOS (on Spanish Wikipedia)

References

External links
 Long interview with Dave Haynie (in French)
 Carsten Schlote's homepage with details on the Metabox 1000 OS 'CaOS' (Old Link)
 Interview (in Norwegian) with Dave Haynie
 Frog Pond Media
 Deathbed Vigil DVD
 Nomadio, Inc.
 The Dave Haynie Archives

Amiga people
Computer programmers
Living people
Year of birth missing (living people)